Hubertus Kramer (3 November 1959 – 24 January 2022) was a German politician. He had served in the Landtag of North Rhine-Westphalia since 2005. He died on 24 January 2022, at the age of 62.

References

1959 births
2022 deaths
21st-century German politicians
Members of the Landtag of North Rhine-Westphalia
Social Democratic Party of Germany politicians
People from Olpe (district)